

Timeline

1857
 July: First attempt (from Breuil) by Jean-Antoine Carrel,  Jean-Jacques Carrel, and Amé Gorret.

1858
 August: Attempt by J. A. and J. J. Carrel. The Grande Tour is reached (3800 m).

1860
 July 2: Attempt from Zermatt (East face) by Charles, Alfred and Sandbach Parker (c. 3500 m)
 August: Attempt by John Tyndall, Vaughan Hawkins, J. J. Carrel (3960 m)

1861
 July 4: Second attempt by the Parker brothers (c. 3570 m)
 August 29: J. A. and J. J. Carrel. The Crête du Coq is reached (4032 m)
 August 29–30: First attempt by Edward Whymper and Swiss guide (Lion ridge)

1862
 January: First winter attempt (from Zermatt East face) by Thomas Stuart Kennedy guided by Peter Perren and Peter Taugwalder (c. 3350 m)
 July 7–8: Attempt by E. Whymper, Reginald J. S. MacDonald, Johann zum Taugwald, Johann Krönig, Luc Meynet (3657 m)
 July 9–10: Attempt by E. Whymper, R. J. S. MacDonald, J. A. Carrel, Pession (3960 m)
 July 18–19: Solo attempt by E. Whymper (4084 m)
 July 23–24: Attempt by E. Whymper, J. A. Carrel, César Carrel, L. Meynet (4008 m)
 July 25–26: Attempt by E. Whymper, L. Meynet (4102 m)
 July 27–28: Attempt by J. Tyndall, Anton Walters, J. A. Carrel, C. Carrel. The Shoulder is reached (Pic Tyndall, 4258 m)

1863
 August 10–11: Attempt by E. Whymper, J. A. Carrel, C. Carrel, L. Meynet and two porters (4047 m)

1865
 June 21: Attempt from the south east face (Furggen couloir) by E. Whymper, Michel Croz, Christian Almer, Franz Biner, L. Meynet (3414 m)
 July: Attempt by J. A. Carrel, C. Carrel, Charles Gorret, . Pic Tyndall, 4258 m
 July 14: First ascent (Hörnli ridge) by E. Whymper, Francis Douglas, Charles Hudson, Douglas Hadow, Michel Croz, P. Taugwalder (father), Peter Taugwalder (son). Death of Douglas, Hudson, Hadow and Croz on the descent.
 July 17: Second ascent and first from the Italian side by J.-A. Carrel and Jean-Baptiste Bich. A. Gorret, of the 1857 attempt, and Jean-Augustin Meynet stop just short of the summit.

1867
 August 15: 3rd ascent. Second ascent from Breuil by J. A. Carrel, J. B. Bich, and Salomon Meynet guiding Florence Crauford Grove.
 September 13: 4th ascent: First direct ascent of the Lion ridge as it is climbed today by Jean-Joseph and Jean-Pierre Maquignaz.
 October 1–3: 5th ascent: From Breuil.  J. J. and J. P. Maquignaz, C. Carrel and François Ansermin guiding William Leighton Jordan.

1868
 July 28: 7th ascent: First traverse of the summit (Lion and Hörnli ridges) by J. Tyndall, J. J. and J. P. Maquignaz.
 August 4: 8th ascent Second traverse of the summit (Hörnli and Lion ridges) by J. J. Maquignaz, Victor Maquignaz and Elie Pession guiding François Thioly and O. Hoiler.
 August 3–4: 9th ascent: P. Knubel, Hans Baumann, Peter Bernett guiding George Edward Foster.
 August 8: 10th ascent: J. M. Lochmatter, P. Knubel and Niklaus Knubel guiding Paul Güssfeldt.

1869
 July 20: 15th ascent: J. A. Carrel, J. B. Bich,  Alphonse Payot and  guiding James Eccles.
 August 26: 16th ascent: Ascent of the Lion ridge by Joseph, Pierre and Emmanuel Maquignaz and B. Bich guiding Robert Boothby Heathcote; it was on this occasion that the guides fixed at the last bit the rope ladder which was called the Echelle Jordan, from the name of its donor.

1871
 July 22: First ascent by a woman: Lucy Walker reached the summit with her father Frank Walker and Frederick Gardiner, guided by Heinrich and Melchior Anderegg, N. Knubel, P. Knubel and P. Perren.
 September 5: First traverse by a woman: Meta Brevoort with W.A.B. Coolidge guided by Christian Almer, Ulrich Almer and N. Knubel.

1872
 July 26: Traverse Breuil-summit-Zermatt in 18 hours by J. J. Maquignaz and Anton Ritz guiding J. Jackson.

1876
 July 23: First ascent without mountain guides by John Brise Colgrove, Albert Harold Cawood and Arthur Cust.

1879
 September 3: First ascent via the Zmutt ridge by Albert F. Mummery, Alexander Burgener, Johann Petrus and Augustin Gentinetta.
 One hour later William Penhall,  and Louis Zurbrücken finished the first ascent (partially) over the west face (significantly overlapping the Zmutt Ridge route)
 September 6: Second ascent of the Zmutt ridge by Baumann with guides J. Petrus and Émile Rey.

1880
 July 16: A. Burgener, Benedikt Venetz and A. F. Mummery attempted the first ascent of the Furggen ridge. At the level of the Swiss Shoulder they were forced to traverse along the east face to the Swiss ridge, to climb to the summit by the ordinary route.

1881
 August 4: Ascent by future US President Theodore Roosevelt, guided by Taugwalder.

1882
 March 16: First winter ascent (Lion ridge) by J. A. Carrel, J. Baptiste Carrel and Louis Carrel guiding Vittorio Sella. Descent via the Hörnli ridge (17th).

1889
 Ascent by Achille Ratti (later Pope Pius XI)

1894
 Polish ascent by Marian Smoluchowski and other team.

1895
 August 25: Luigi Amedeo, Duke of the Abruzzi, A. F. Mummery and J. Norman Collie made the ascent with the guide Josef Pollinger.
 August 31: First descent of the Zmutt ridge by Matthias Zurbriggen and J. Pollinger guiding Lily Bristow.

1898

1906

1911
 September 9: First ascent via the Furggen ridge by Mario Piacenza with guides Jean-Joseph Carrel and Joseph Gaspard.
 January 31: First winter ascent via the Hörnli ridge by Charles Francis Meade with the guides Josef Lochmatter and J. Pollinger.

1923
The summit was reached via the Hörnli ridge.

1928
 August: Attempt on the north face by Kaspar Mooser and Victor Imboden.

1931
 October 15: First ascent of the south face by Enzo Benedetti with guides Louis Carrel and Maurice Bich.

1932
 August 12–13: First all-female unguided ascent by Miriam Underhill (United States) and Alice Damesme (France).
 September 19: First complete ascent of the east face by Enzo Benedetti and Giuseppe Mazzotti with guides Louis and Lucien Carrel, M. Bich and Antoine Gaspard.

1934
 Paul Petzoldt traversed the Matterhorn and then retraced his route over the summit on the same day.

1936
 First winter solo ascent via the Hörnli ridge by Giusto Gervasutti.

1948
 March 25: First winter ascent via the Zmutt ridge by Henri Masson and Edmund Petrig.

1950
 August 19: First ascent by a cat (Hörnli ridge). It climbed up entirely unaided, but made its descent in a guide's rucksack.

1959
 July 22: First solo ascent of the north face by Dieter Marchart.

1961 
 Fast ascent by Ian Angell in 3 hours and 25 minutes.

1962
 August 13: First complete ascent of the west face by Renato Daguin and Giovanni Ottin. All faces and ridges have been completely ascended

1965
 February 22: In winter and alone, Walter Bonatti climbs a direct new route on the north face, the "North Face Direct". Bonatti set off on February 18, accompanied by three friends in order to simulate an ordinary day of alpine skiing. He prepared himself in secret behind a boulder, then for the next four days struggled against solitude, cold and technical difficulties.
 July 13: Yvette Vaucher, climbing with her husband Michel Vaucher, becomes the first woman to climb the Matterhorn's north face.

1969
 Ascent of the north face by Jean Troillet in 4 hours and 10 minutes.

1970
August Attempted ascent of the Swiss side of the Matterhorn by Japanese climbers Michio Oikawa and Masayuki Kobayashi who disappeared. Remains found in Sept 2014 and identified in August 2015

1971
 December 23: First winter ascent via the south face by Arturo Squinobal and Oreste Squinobal.

1975
 February 28: First winter ascent via the east face by René Arnold, Guido Bumann and Candide Pralong.

1977
 February 16: First winter solo ascent of the Schmid route on the north face by Tsuneo Hasegawa.

1978
 January 11: First winter ascent of the west face by Rolando Albertini, Marco Barmasse, Innocenzo Menabreaz, Leo Pession, A. Squinobal, O. Squinobal and Augusto Tamone. Death of Rolando Albertini.
 March 10: First winter all-female ascent of the north face, the Schmid route, by Polish team Anna Czerwińska, Irena Kęsa, Krystyna Palmowska and Wanda Rutkiewicz.

1990
 Mountain guide Ulrich Inderbinen makes his 370th and last ascent of the Matterhorn, before his 90th birthday.

1992
 August 20: Hans Kammerlander and  climb the Matterhorn four times in 23 hours and 26 minutes. The route they followed was: Zmutt ridge–summit–Hörnli ridge (descent)–Furggen ridge–summit–Lion ridge (descent)–Lion ridge–summit–Hörnli ridge (descent)–Hörnli ridge–summit–Hörnli Hut (descent).

1994
 March 11: Second ascent of the North Face Direct (Bonatti route), and first female ascent, by Catherine Destivelle (started on 8th).

1995
 August 17: Bruno Brunod sprints up and down the Lion ridge from Breuil, ascending and descending 2469 vertical meters in 3hrs and 14 minutes.

2007
 September 6: Mountain guides Simon Anthamatten and Michael Lerjen, both of Zermatt, ascended and descended the Hörnli ridge in a record retour (combined time of ascent and descent) of 2 hours and 33 minutes (ascent: 1 hour and 40 minutes, descent: 53 minutes).

2009
 January 13: Ueli Steck climbs the classic Schmid route on the north face in 1 hour and 56 minutes.
 June: Swiss mountain guide Jean Troillet climbs a 600 meters new route on the north face.

2011
 August 23: Andreas Steindl runs 2915 vertical meters from Zollhaus, Zermatt, up the Matterhorn over the Hörnli ridge in a record time of 2 hours and 57 minutes.

2013
 August 21: Kilian Jornet sprints up and down the shortest ridge of the Matterhorn in 2 hours and 52 minute, breaking Brunod's Lion ridge run from Breuil by 22 minutes

2015
April 22: Dani Arnold climbs the classic Schmid route on the North Face in a one-hour and 46 minutes, 10 minutes faster than Ueli Steck in 2009.

References

 Helmut Dumler and Willi P. Burkhardt, The High Mountains of the Alps, London: Diadem, 1994

Matterhorn
History of mountaineering
Regional timelines
Mountaineering in the Alps
Mountaineering in Switzerland
Mountaineering in Italy
History of the Alps